The Jack Milne Cup is a speedway competition.  It is run annually in honour of the 1937 World Speedway Champion Jack Milne.  It is one of five major events held annually at the Costa Mesa Speedway.

Roll of honour
Roll of Honour featuring all Jack Milne Cup finalists

References

Speedway in the United States